El Heraldo ("The Herald") may refer to any of the following Spanish-language newspapers:
El Heraldo (Colombia)
El Heraldo de Cuba
El Heraldo (Tegucigalpa)
El Heraldo de Madrid, Spanish daily newspaper published 1890–1939
El Heraldo de México
Heraldo Filipino, student newspaper of De La Salle University-Dasmariñas in the Philippines.
Heraldo de Aragón
El Nuevo Heraldo, in Miami, Florida

See also 

Giraldo, a surname
Heraldo, a given name